Crestview is a Capital MetroRail commuter rail station and Capital MetroRapid bus rapid transit station in Austin, Texas. It is at the edge of the Crestview neighborhood of North Austin, at the corner of Airport Boulevard and North Lamar Boulevard. There is no on-site parking at the Crestview station. Riders must park at the North Lamar Transit center and take buses 1 or 801 south to the train. With Project Connect, the Blue and Orange Lines will have a connection to this station.

Location
Crestview station sits on the former site of a Huntsman Petroleum Research and Development center which operated there from 1949 until 2005. Trammel Crow Co. and Stratus Properties Inc. bought the site in 2005 and led a large clean-up effort. During the clean-up, known carcinogen benzene was found in a small amount in the southwestern part of the property. However, the benzene was found to be in saturated soil and posed no threat to people.

Pedestrian connectivity
A local civic group, Sustainable Neighborhoods of North Central Austin, in 2009 identified the Crestview-Highland segment of CapMetro's Rails with Trails project as its "Project of the Year".  The trail, intended to run beside the commuter track, would provide pedestrian and bicycle access to the station from surrounding neighborhoods. One of the largest transit oriented developments in Austin is centered on the Crestview Station.

Bus connections
 #1 N. Lamar/S. Congress
 #7 Duval/Dove Springs (terminus)
 #300 Springdale/Oltorf (terminus)
 
 #481 Night Owl N. Lamar
 #801 N. Lamar/S. Congress Rapid

References

External links
 Crestview station overview
 Station from Easy Wind Dr. from Google Maps Street View
 Welcome to Crestview Station

Capital MetroRail stations in Austin
Railway stations in the United States opened in 2010
Railway stations in Travis County, Texas